Albert Stanley "Al" Bregman  (born September 15, 1936) is a Canadian professor and researcher in experimental psychology, cognitive science, and Gestalt psychology, primarily in the perceptual organization of sound.

He is known for having defined and conceptually organized the field of auditory scene analysis (ASA) in his 1990 book, Auditory Scene Analysis: the perceptual Organization of Sound (MIT Press). His ideas about ASA have provided a new framework for research in the auditory systems of both humans and non-human animals, for behavioral and neurological studies of speech perception, for music theory, hearing aids, audio technology, and the separation of speech from other sounds by computers (CASA). In acknowledgement of these contributions, he has been called "the father of auditory scene analysis".

He currently holds a post-retirement appointment at the rank of emeritus professor in the Department of Psychology at McGill University. Arriving at McGill in 1965, he became the first professor there to teach cognitive psychology. He has also taught courses on Computer and Man, Research methods in experimental psychology, Learning Theory, Auditory Perception, Psychological Theory, and honors research seminars.

Many of his McGill undergraduate students have gone on to make significant contributions to intellectual life. These include Steven Pinker, Adam Gopnik, Paul Bloom, Stevan Harnad, Alfonso Caramazza, Marcel Just, Stephen McAdams, Bruce Walker, Susan Pinker, Alexander I. Rudnicky, and Alison Gopnik. His graduate students have included, among others, Gary L. Dannenbring, Valter Ciocca, Howard Steiger, Martine Turgeon, Poppy A.C. Crum, Michael Mills (Communications), James K. Wright (Music), and Francesco Tordini (Electrical Engineering). Postdoctoral fellows in his laboratory have included Richard Parncutt, Sheila Williams, and Brian Roberts.

Biography

Personal
Bregman was born in Toronto, Ontario, Canada in 1936. His father was an office manager and his mother, a home-maker. He has one sister, who lives in Jerusalem, Israel. His wife is a retired history professor and active artist. He has three stepdaughters and two stepsons.

Academic career
Bregman received a Bachelor of Arts degree from University College of the University of Toronto, with a concentration in Philosophy (ethics), in 1957. He received a master's degree in Psychology, also from the University of Toronto, in 1959, after which he worked as a research assistant for two summers for Endel Tulving, studying how subjective organization affected the process of memorization. In 1963, he received a PhD degree from Yale University, where he had gone, in 1959, to study the formation of concepts with Carl I. Hovland. However, after Hovland died in 1961, he did his dissertation research on human memory, supervised by Fred D. Sheffield.

From 1962 to 1965, he was a research fellow at the Center for Cognitive Studies established by George A. Miller and Jerome S. Bruner at Harvard University, where he continued to study memory. There, he and Donald A. Norman set up one of the earliest computer systems for controlling psychological experiments, based on a PDP-4 computer. He also taught two courses in the Harvard Psychology Department. One was the laboratory section of a course in experimental psychology, taught by Richard Herrnstein; the other was a graduate seminar in learning theory.

He arrived at McGill University in 1965 as an assistant professor in the Department of Psychology, rose to the rank of full professor, and in 1999 received a lifetime post-retirement appointment in the Psychology Department at the rank of emeritus professor. He spent sabbatical periods at Cornell University, the University of Sussex, and at Stanford University, where he was associated with the Center for Computer Research in Music and Acoustics (CCRMA), founded by John Chowning. He has given invited lectures on auditory scene analysis at many universities, including Harvard, MIT, Yale, Oxford, Cambridge, Stanford, UC Berkeley, UCLA, Cornell, Virginia, Toronto, Hong Kong, ETH Zürich, Oldenburg, Thessaloniki, and the New University of Lisbon, as well as at research institutes including Advanced Technology Research (ATR) in Kyoto, Nippon Telegraph and Telephone (NTT) in Tokyo, the Kitano Symbiotic Systems Project in Tokyo, and Dolby Labs in San Francisco.

Auditory scene analysis

Bregman's first research at McGill was a continuation of his earlier research on memory. However, in 1969, while preparing a recording of a rapid succession of sounds for an experiment on learning, he made a fortuitous discovery.

I was preparing an experiment on learning, involving a rapid sequence of unrelated sounds, each about the length of a speech phoneme.  I spliced together one-tenth-second segments of many different sounds – water splashing in a sink, a dentist's drill, a tone, a vowel, etc. When I played the tape back to myself, though, I did not experience the sequences in the order that they were recorded on the tape.  It appeared that non-adjacent sounds were grouping together and appeared to be adjacent.  It was the similar sounds that seemed to be forming integrated perceptual sequences.  This reminded me of an essay I had written at the University of Toronto on the topic of Gestalt Psychology.  Some of the Gestaltist's examples showed that similar visual forms would group together and segregate from dissimilar ones.  Perhaps an analogous sort of grouping might be happening in my auditory sequence.  Although I had never been trained in auditory perception research, this one subjective experience set me off on a 36-year period of study." 

To support this research, he developed a computer-based laboratory based on a PDP-11 computer for working with auditory and visual signals and testing human subjects. Laboratory supervisors included Gary Bernstein, Gary Dannenbring, Philippe Grall, Sharif Qureshi, and Pierre Abdel Ahad.

He developed the concept of auditory stream segregation (also called "streaming") to describe how a single sequence of sounds could be interpreted by the auditory system as two or more concurrent streams of sound. Extensive research by Bregman and his students and postdoctoral fellows exposed many of the acoustic variables that controlled this process. Eventually he came to think of streaming as a part of a larger auditory process, which he called "auditory scene analysis" (ASA), a process responsible for analyzing the complex mixture of sound that reaches the listener's ears and for building distinct perceptual representations of the individual acoustic sources that were buried in the mixture.

Bregman's work on ASA has had influences outside the field of experimental psychology.  In a field called Computational auditory scene analysis (CASA), the principles of ASA have been used in the development of computer systems that carry out ASA automatically, for example segregating speech from other concurrent sounds.  The principles have been applied to music to explain the segregation and integration of musical sounds  and have also been applied to speech perception ASA has been found in human newborns  and in non-human animals, suggesting an innate basis for the process.

In 1992, Bregman set up an electronic mail list, AUDITORY, on the topic of auditory perception. Administered by Professor Daniel P. Ellis, Dept. of Electrical Engineering, Columbia University, it includes over 2500 researchers and practitioners of the auditory arts and sciences in about 45 countries (as of Aug 2011).

Honors and awards

Bregman was elected fellow of the Canadian Psychological Association (CPA) in 1978, the American Psychological Association in 1984, and the Royal Society of Canada in 1995. From 1984 to 1986 he held a Killam Research Fellowship from the Canada Council. In 1995 he was awarded the Jacques Rousseau Medal for interdisciplinary contributions by the Association francophone pour le savoir. In 2004, he received the CPA Donald O. Hebb Award for Distinguished Contributions to Psychology as a Science and in 2012, the Queen Elizabeth II Diamond Jubilee Medal from the Governor General of Canada.

Bregman's extensive research on ASA has yielded one book, one audio compact disk, three articles in encyclopedias or handbooks, 16 book chapters, and 53 papers in scientific journals.  In addition he has published 12 scientific articles on other perception-related topics, and six on human memory.

Selected publications

Books

 Bregman, A.S. (1990). Auditory Scene Analysis: The Perceptual Organization of Sound. Cambridge, Mass.: Bradford Books, MIT Press. (Paperback, 1994)

Audio compact disk

 Bregman, A.S., & Ahad, P.A. (1996) Demonstrations of Auditory Scene Analysis: The Perceptual Organization of Sound. Audio compact disk. (Distributed by MIT Press).

Articles in encyclopedias and handbooks

 Bregman, A.S. (2004) Auditory scene analysis.  In N.J. Smelzer & P.B. Baltes (Eds.) International Encyclopedia of the Social and Behavioral Sciences. Amsterdam: Pergamon (Elsevier). pp. 940–942.
 Bregman, A.S. (2008) Auditory scene analysis. In Encyclopedia of Neuroscience. (L.R. Squire, Editor.) Oxford: Academic Press.
 Bregman, A.S. (2007) Auditory scene analysis. In  A.I. Basbaum, A. Koneko, G.M. Shepherd & G.Westheimer (Eds.) The Senses: A Comprehensive Reference, Vol. 3, Audition, P. Dallos & D. Oertel (Volume Eds.) San Diego: Academic Press, 2008, pp. 861–870.

Selected book chapters

 Bregman, A.S. (1978). The formation of auditory streams.  In J. Réquin  (Ed.), Attention and Performance VII. Hillsdale, New Jersey: Lawrence Erlbaum.
 Bregman, A.S. (1981). Asking the "what for" question in auditory perception. In M. Kubovy and J.R. Pomerantz (Eds.), Perceptual Organization. Hillsdale, New Jersey:  Lawrence Erlbaum.
 Bregman, A.S. (1993). Auditory scene analysis: Listening in complex environments.  In S.E. McAdams, and E. Bigand (Eds.) Thinking in sound.  London: Oxford University Press, pp. 10–36.
 Bregman, A.S. (1998).  Psychological data and computational ASA. In David F. Rosenthal and Hiroshi G. Okuno (Eds.), Computational Auditory Scene Analysis. Mahwah, NJ: Erlbaum.

Selected papers in scientific journals

Other publications

For a full list of publications, see: Al Bregman, Auditory scene analysis.

References

Living people
1936 births
Academic staff of McGill University
Auditory scientists
Fellows of the Royal Society of Canada
Canadian psychologists